Stratford District may refer to the following places:

 Stratford District, New Zealand, in the Taranaki Region of New Zealand
 Stratford-on-Avon District, in southern Warwickshire, England, formed in 1974
 Municipal Borough of Stratford-upon-Avon, a district of Warwickshire abolished in 1974 containing the town of Stratford-upon-Avon

See also 
 Stratford, London, a metropolitan district in the London Borough of Newham in Greater London, England
 Stratford (disambiguation)